The following television stations broadcast on digital channel 13 in the United States:

 K13AT-D in Dolores, Colorado
 K13AV-D in Gunnison, Colorado, on virtual channel 13
 K13BA-D in Winthrop-Twisp, Washington
 K13BE-D in Harlowton, Montana
 K13BI-D in Entiat, Washington
 K13CP-D in Cedar City, Utah
 K13CQ-D in Rock Island, Washington
 K13DU-D in Whitewater, Montana
 K13ER-D in Cashmere, Washington
 K13FP-D in Wolf Point, Montana
 K13GP-D in Malta, Montana
 K13HA-D in Mink Creek, Idaho, on virtual channel 5, which rebroadcasts KSL-TV
 K13HM-D in Myrtle Creek, Oregon
 K13HU-D in Fort Jones, etc., California
 K13IB-D in Glasgow, Montana
 K13IG-D in Sidney-Fairview, Montana
 K13IY-D in Leavenworth, Washington
 K13JD-D in Battle Mountain, Nevada
 K13JO-D in Hinsdale, Montana
 K13KH-D in Townsend, Montana
 K13KP-D in Boulder, Montana
 K13KU-D in Delta Junction, Alaska
 K13KV-D in Troy, Montana
 K13LN-D in Ekalaka, Montana
 K13LU-D in Ursine, Nevada
 K13LV-D in Caliente, Nevada
 K13MA-D in Scobey, Montana
 K13MI-D in Squaw Valley, etc., Oregon
 K13ML-D in Hotchkiss, etc., Colorado
 K13NQ-D in Ruth, Nevada
 K13NR-D in Ely & McGill, Nevada
 K13NZ-D in Shoshoni, Wyoming
 K13OC-D in Douglas, etc., Alaska
 K13OG-D in Rural Juab, etc., Utah
 K13OQ-D in Big Sandy, Montana
 K13OU-D in Chinook, Montana
 K13OW-D in Baker, Montana
 K13PE-D in Shady Grove, Oregon
 K13PF-D in Pinehurst, Oregon
 K13PI-D in Ruch & Applegate, Oregon
 K13PJ-D in Vallecito, Colorado
 K13PO-D in Hysham, Montana
 K13PU-D in Pioche, Nevada
 K13PZ-D in Poplar, Montana
 K13QE-D in Driggs, Idaho
 K13QH-D in Swan Valley/Irwin, Idaho
 K13QK-D in Virgin, Utah
 K13QY-D in Dingle, etc., Idaho
 K13RD-D in Collbran, Colorado
 K13RK-D in Roswell, New Mexico
 K13RN-D in Old Harbor, Alaska
 K13RR-D in Tok, Alaska
 K13RV-D in Leadore, Idaho
 K13SA-D in Port Heiden, Alaska
 K13SE-D in Stony River, Alaska
 K13SM-D in Slana, Alaska
 K13SN-D in Nucla, Colorado
 K13SV-D in Pedro Bay, Alaska
 K13SY-D in Birch Creek, Alaska
 K13TD-D in White Mountain, Alaska
 K13TE-D in Bettles, Alaska
 K13TJ-D in Mountain Village, Alaska
 K13TN-D in Manley Hot Springs, Alaska
 K13TR-D in Homer, Alaska
 K13UF-D in Rexburg, Idaho
 K13UL-D in Hillsboro, New Mexico
 K13UO-D in Cold Bay, Alaska
 K13UV-D in Napakiak, Alaska
 K13WT-D in Plevna, Montana
 K13XG-D in Ismay Canyon, Colorado
 K13XH-D in Weber Canyon, Colorado
 K13XW-D in Akron, Colorado, on virtual channel 6, which rebroadcasts KRMA-TV
 K13XX-D in Hesperus, Colorado
 K13ZI-D in Colorado Springs, Colorado
 K13ZL-D in Fresno, California
 K13ZN-D in Heron, Montana
 K13ZQ-D in Lubbock, Texas
 K13ZS-D in Sargents, Colorado, on virtual channel 9
 K13AAE-D in Healy, Alaska
 K13AAI-D in Marysvale, Utah
 K13AAJ-D in Woodland & Kamas, Utah
 K13AAL-D in Beaver etc., Utah
 K13AAM-D in Garrison, etc., Utah
 K13AAN-D in Roosevelt, Utah, on virtual channel 13, which rebroadcasts KSTU
 K13AAO-D in Helper, Utah
 K13AAP-D in East Price, Utah, on virtual channel 13, which rebroadcasts KSTU
 K13AAQ-D in Prineville, etc., Oregon
 K13AAX-D in Redding, California
 K21FL-D in Salina & Redmond, Utah
 K42IW-D in Long Valley Junction, Utah
 K48BK-D in Monticello/Blanding, Utah, on virtual channel 8, which rebroadcasts KJCT-LP
 KAKW-DT in Killeen, Texas
 KBDI-TV in Broomfield, Colorado, on virtual channel 12
 KBZK in Bozeman, Montana
 KCOP-TV in Los Angeles, California, on virtual channel 13
 KCOS in El Paso, Texas
 KCPQ in Tacoma, Washington, on virtual channel 13
 KDPH-LD in Phoenix, Arizona, on virtual channel 48
 KECI-TV in Missoula, Montana
 KEMV in Mountain View, Arkansas
 KETA-TV in Oklahoma City, Oklahoma
 KETG in Arkadelphia, Arkansas
 KFJX in Pittsburg, Kansas
 KFME in Fargo, North Dakota
 KFPH-DT in Flagstaff, Arizona, on virtual channel 13
 KGWR-TV in Rock Springs, Wyoming
 KHGI-TV in Kearney, Nebraska
 KHTM-LD in Lufkin, Texas
 KHVO in Hilo, Hawaii
 KJDA-LD in Sherman, Texas
 KKEY-LP in Bakersfield, California
 KLTM-TV in Monroe, Louisiana
 KNTV in San Jose, California, on virtual channel 11
 KOLD-TV in Tucson, Arizona
 KOTI in Klamath Falls, Oregon
 KPLO-TV in Reliance, South Dakota
 KPSD-TV in Eagle Butte, South Dakota
 KQVE-LD in San Antonio, Texas
 KREY-TV in Montrose, Colorado
 KRGV-TV in Weslaco, Texas
 KRQE in Albuquerque, New Mexico
 KSFY-TV in Sioux Falls, South Dakota
 KSGW-TV in Sheridan, Wyoming
 KTNE-TV in Alliance, Nebraska
 KTNV-TV in Las Vegas, Nevada
 KTRK-TV in Houston, Texas, on virtual channel 13
 KTRV-TV in Nampa, Idaho
 KTVR in La Grande, Oregon
 KUBD in Ketchikan, Alaska
 KUPK in Garden City, Kansas
 KUTA-LD in Ogden, Utah
 KVAL-TV in Eugene, Oregon
 KXDF-CD in Fairbanks, Alaska
 KXHG-LD in Sunnyside, Washington
 KXLY-TV in Spokane, Washington
 KXMC-TV in Minot, North Dakota
 KXXW-LD in Tyler, Texas
 KYLX-LD in Laredo, Texas
 KYMA-DT in Yuma, Arizona
 W13DI-D in Yauco, etc., Puerto Rico, on virtual channel 54, which rebroadcasts WCCV-TV
 W13DP-D in Youngstown, Ohio
 W13DQ-D in Atlanta, Georgia
 W13DS-D in Cleveland, Ohio
 W13DV-D in Crozet, Virginia
 WABI-TV in Bangor, Maine
 WASA-LD in Port Jervis, New York
 WBKO in Bowling Green, Kentucky
 WBRZ-TV in Baton Rouge, Louisiana
 WBTW in Florence, South Carolina
 WDSS-LD in Syracuse, New York, uses WNYI's spectrum
 WEDQ in Tampa, Florida, which uses WEDU's spectrum, on virtual channel 13
 WEDU in Tampa, Florida, on virtual channel 13
 WGBY-TV in Springfield, Massachusetts
 WHBQ-TV in Memphis, Tennessee
 WHO-DT in Des Moines, Iowa
 WHYY-TV in Wilmington, Delaware, on virtual channel 12
 WIBW-TV in Topeka, Kansas
 WIRT-DT in Hibbing, Minnesota
 WIVX-LD in Akron, Ohio, on virtual channel 13, which rebroadcasts WIVM-LD
 WKOB-LD in New York, New York
 WLOS in Asheville, North Carolina, on virtual channel 13
 WMAZ-TV in Macon, Georgia
 WMBB in Panama City, Florida
 WMCN-TV in Princeton, New Jersey, uses WHYY-TV's spectrum, on virtual channel 44
 WMEL-LD in Grenada, Mississippi
 WMOW in Crandon, Wisconsin
 WNYI in Ithaca, New York
 WODN-LD in Portage, Indiana
 WORO-DT in Fajardo, Puerto Rico, on virtual channel 13
 WPEC in West Palm Beach, Florida
 WPXS in Mount Vernon, Illinois, on virtual channel 13
 WRCB in Chattanooga, Tennessee
 WREX in Rockford, Illinois
 WSKY-TV in Manteo, North Carolina
 WTHR in Indianapolis, Indiana, on virtual channel 13
 WTLV in Jacksonville, Florida
 WTOK-TV in Meridian, Mississippi
 WTSF in Ashland, Kentucky
 WTVG in Toledo, Ohio
 WVEC in Hampton, Virginia
 WVTM-TV in Birmingham, Alabama
 WVUX-LD in Fairmont, West Virginia
 WWPX-TV in Martinsburg, West Virginia, on virtual channel 60
 WXVO-LD in Pascagoula, Mississippi
 WZZM in Grand Rapids, Michigan

The following stations, which are no longer licensed, formerly broadcast on digital channel 13 in the United States:
 K13EZ-D in Squilchuck St. Park, Washington
 K13UK-D in Kwigillingok, Alaska
 KVTV in Laredo, Texas
 W13DU-D in Hardeeville, South Carolina

References

13 digital